Dato' Suleiman bin Abdul Rahman (27 February 1912 – 6 November 1963) was a Malaysian politician who served as Minister of the Interior (1959–1961) and Malaysian High Commissioner to Australia from 1961 until his death on 6 November 1963. He was the eldest son of Abdul Rahman Mohamed Yassin, 1st President of the Dewan Negara (1959–1968) and the brother of Ismail Abdul Rahman, 2nd Deputy Prime Minister of Malaysia (1970–1973).

Awards and recognitions

Honours of Malaya
  :
  Commander of the Order of the Defender of the Realm (PMN) – Tan Sri, formerly Dato' (1959)
  :
  Knight Grand Commander of the Order of the Crown of Johor (SPMJ) – Dato' (1960)

Places named after him 
Several places were named after him, including:
 Kampung Dato' Sulaiman Menteri, a village in Johor Bahru, Johor
 Jalan Dato' Sulaiman, a street in Johor Bahru, Johor
 SMK Dato' Sulaiman, a secondary school in Parit Sulong, Batu Pahat, Johor
 Jalan Datuk Sulaiman, Taman Tun Dr. Ismail, Kuala Lumpur

References 

1912 births
1963 deaths
People from Johor Bahru
United Malays National Organisation politicians
20th-century Malaysian politicians
Commanders of the Order of the Defender of the Realm
Knights Grand Commander of the Order of the Crown of Johor
Home ministers of Malaysia
Malaysian Muslims
Government ministers of Malaysia
Members of the Dewan Rakyat
Malayan people of World War II
Malaysian people of Malay descent
High Commissioners of Malaysia to Australia